Foster Child is a 1987 documentary film by Gil Cardinal, exploring the filmmaker's search, at age thirty-five, for biological family. Cardinal often meets with frustration during his search, but eventually finds his natural family and discovers his Métis roots.

In Foster Child, Cardinal documents his discovery of his past, including the reasons why his birth mother gave him up for adoption when he was one year old, and sees photographs of his deceased biological mother for the first time. He learns in the film that she had died in 1974, after a long history of alcohol and poverty.

This National Film Board of Canada production received over 10 awards, including four Golden Sheaf Awards, a Special Jury Prize at the Banff Television Festival and a Gemini Award for best direction for a documentary program. It was broadcast on CBC's Man Alive series.

See also
Richard Cardinal: Cry from a Diary of a Métis Child

References

External links
Watch Foster Child at NFB.ca

1987 films
Canadian Screen Award-winning television shows
National Film Board of Canada documentaries
Documentary films about adoption
Métis film
Autobiographical documentary films
1987 documentary films
Indigenous child displacement in Canada
Documentary films about Indigenous peoples in Canada
1980s English-language films
1980s Canadian films